The Last Amateurs is a book by John Feinstein. First published in 2000, the book chronicles the 1999–2000 Patriot League basketball season.

It emphasizes the efforts of the true scholar-athletes at the highly respected institutions that make up the league, where academics come first, and athletes play for love of the game rather than as a farm team for the NBA.

The seven teams in the Patriot League at the time were Army, Bucknell, Colgate, Holy Cross, Lafayette, Lehigh, and Navy. Since the book was published American University, Boston University, and Loyola University-Maryland have joined the league.

In popular culture
The book made an appearance in sports culture in 2010, when future basketball statistical guru Drew Cannon cited it in a report he wrote for Scout.com on mid-major recruiting:In John Feinstein’s The Last Amateurs, he talks about a Holy Cross player named Chris Spitler, who at one point described himself as the worst player on the worst team in the worst conference in Division I. Feinstein discussed the three stages of Chris Spitler (paraphrased): 1. There’s no way in hell you’re making this team. 2. OK, you’re on the team, but you’ll never play. 3. You’re starting. Adam Emmenecker added a stage: 4. You’re the Conference Player of the Year.

References

1999–2000 NCAA Division I men's basketball season
2000 non-fiction books
American non-fiction books
Basketball books
Patriot League men's basketball